The Battle of Binagadi was a battle in World War I that took place between 26 and 31 August 1918 between the Ottoman–Azerbaijani coalition forces led by Nuri Pasha and the British–Armenian–White Russian forces led by Lionel Dunsterville and saw briefly Soviet Russia re-enter the war. The battle was fought as an important part of the Battle of Baku.

Background 
In 1917, the Russian Caucasus Front collapsed following the abdication of the Tsar. On 9 March 1917, the Special Transcaucasian Committee was established to fill the administrative gap in areas occupied in the course of the war on the Caucasian front by the Russian Provisional Government in the Transcaucasia. In November 1917, the first government of the independent Transcaucasia was created in Tbilisi and named the Transcaucasian Commissariat following the Bolshevik seizure of power in St. Petersburg. On 5 December 1917, this new "Transcaucasian Committee" gave endorsement to the Armistice of Erzincan which was signed by the Russians with the command of the Ottoman Third Army. Russian soldiers mainly left the front and returned to their homes. A number of Russian troops left for the Persian Campaign, contrary to the rules of the Armistice.

On 10 February 1918, the Sejm gathered and made the decision to establish independence. On 24 February 1918, the Sejm proclaimed the Transcaucasia as independent under the Transcaucasian Democratic Federative Republic.

On 3 March 1918, the Grand Vizier Talat Pasha signed the Treaty of Brest-Litovsk with the Russian SFSR. The Treaty of Brest-Litovsk stipulated that the border be pulled back to prewar levels and that the cities of Batum, Kars, and Ardahan be transferred to the Ottoman Empire. Between 14 March – April 1918, the Trabzon peace conference was held between the Ottoman Empire and the delegation of the Sejm.

On 9 March 1918, the arrest of General Talyshinski, the commander of the Azerbaijani division, and some of its officers all of whom arrived in Baku increased the anti-Soviet feelings among the city's Azerbaijani population. On 30 March, based on the unfounded report that the Azerbaijani (Muslim) crew of the ship Evelina was armed and ready to revolt against the Soviet, the Soviet disarmed the crew who tried to resist. The three days of inter-ethnic warfare referred to as the March Days, which resulted in the massacre of up to 12,000 Azerbaijanis by the Bolsheviks and armed Armenian units in the city of Baku and other locations in the Baku Governorate. The March events, beyond the violent three-day period, touched off a series of massacres all over Azerbaijan.

In May 1918, Azerbaijan declared its independence. At that time, the main goal of the state was to liberate Baku. The Ottoman Empire helped him in this. In June 1918, military operations began for Baku.

Battle 
Battle of Binagadi was important part of Battle of Baku. The main purpose of the battle was to capture the hills 311 and 364 near the village of Binagadi.

In the battle that began on August 26, the 13th Infantry Regiment captured Hill 364. Hill 311 could not be captured. On August 27, Centrocaspian Dictatorship tried to recapture Hill 364, but failed. After a while, the hill 311 was captured by Azerbaijanis. In addition to Binagadi village, Digah and Mohammadi villages were also taken over by Azerbaijanis.

Aftermath 
After the battle, General Lionel Dunsterville declared that "no force on earth can take Baku from the Turks." Thus, in the north of Baku, the Centrocaspian Dictatorship was pushed back to the heights of Bilajari, and important positions were taken for the organization of a decisive attack for the liberation of Baku.

See also 
 Battle of Baku

References

Footnotes

Works cited 
  

Binagadi
1918 in Azerbaijan
Binagadi
Binagadi
Binagadi
Binagadi
Binagadi
Binagadi
Armenian–Azerbaijani war (1918–1920)
Allied intervention in the Russian Civil War
1918 in the Ottoman Empire
August 1918 events
September 1918 events
20th century in Baku
Battles involving Azerbaijan Democratic Republic